"Grantchester Meadows" is the second track from the studio disc of the Pink Floyd album Ummagumma. It was written and performed entirely by Roger Waters. The song features his lyrics accompanied by an acoustic guitar played by Waters himself, while a tape loop of a skylark chirps in the background throughout the entire song. At approximately 4:13, the sound of a honking Bewick's swan is introduced, followed by the sound of it taking off. As the instrumental track fades out, an incessant buzzing bee which has been heard throughout the song is chased after by an unidentified person (represented by the sound of footsteps) and finally swatted, cutting abruptly to the next track.

This song was one of several to be considered for, but ultimately excluded from, the band's "best of" album, Echoes: The Best of Pink Floyd. A live version of the song was released as the first single to promote The Early Years 1965–1972 box set in 2016.

Lyrics

The lyrics describe a pastoral and dream-like scene at Grantchester Meadows in Cambridgeshire, close to where fellow band member David Gilmour lived at the time. This type of pastoral ballad was typical of Roger Waters' compositional approach in the late sixties and early seventies. It was a style that he was to continue on his first album outside of Pink Floyd – Music from "The Body" (in collaboration with Ron Geesin) and "If" from Atom Heart Mother. It is one of several Pink Floyd songs that praise the British countryside.

Sound
The song is noted for its use of stereo effects and sound panning to create an illusion of space and depth.

Live
"Grantchester Meadows" was incorporated into Pink Floyd's The Man and the Journey concert suite as "Daybreak". It was performed live during the 1970 US tour, often opening the show. Live renditions of the song included Gilmour on a second acoustic guitar and providing vocals during the chorus, as well as Richard Wright playing two piano solos—one after the second verse's chorus and one during the coda (these solos were later played on the Farfisa organ).

Personnel
Roger Waters – acoustic guitars, vocals, tape effects

Additional live personnel
David Gilmour – second acoustic guitar, chorus vocals
Richard Wright – piano, later Farfisa organ

References

External links

1969 songs
1960s ballads
Experimental music compositions
Pink Floyd songs
Psychedelic songs
Songs written by Roger Waters
Songs about England
Meadows song